, also known as Let Me Eat Your Pancreas, is a novel by the Japanese writer Yoru Sumino. Initially serialized as a web novel in the user-generated site Shōsetsuka ni Narō in 2014, the book was published in print in 2015 by Futabasha. A manga adaptation ran from 2016 to 2017. A live-action film titled Let Me Eat Your Pancreas premiered in 2017, and an anime film adaptation on September 1, 2018.

Characters
The character names listed here are in western order of family name last. The official English language light novel and manga volumes use the Japanese naming order of family name first, while the English subtitles of the anime use the western order. 
  / 
 

 
 

  /

Media

Novel
Yoru Sumino originally published the novel as a web novel on the user-generated content site Shōsetsuka ni Narō in 2014, before Futabasha republished it with cover art by loundraw on June 19, 2015. English publisher Seven Seas Entertainment announced their license to the novel on March 15, 2018, and it was released on November 20, 2018.

Manga
Izumi Kirihara began serializing a manga adaptation in Futabasha's Monthly Action magazine on August 25, 2016, and ended the series on May 25, 2017. The chapters were compiled into two collected tankōbon volumes, published on February 10, 2017, and June 20, 2017. The manga is also licensed by Seven Seas, who released the first volume on January 22, 2019.

Live-action film

A Japanese live-action film based on the novel, titled Let Me Eat Your Pancreas, starring Takumi Kitamura and Minami Hamabe in the lead roles premiered in Japan on July 28, 2017. The film was also shown in South Korea at the Busan International Film Festival in October 2017, and in Malaysia on November 9, 2017, where it was distributed by GSC Movies.

Anime film

A Japanese animated film adaptation of the novel, titled I Want to Eat Your Pancreas, was announced in August 2017. The film is written for the screen and directed by Shin'ichirō Ushijima and produced by Keiji Mita at Studio VOLN, with music composed by Hiroko Sebu. Yūichi Oka provides the character designs and serves as chief supervising animator. Yukako Ogawa is the background supervisor and is assisted by Yoshito Watanabe. Sound effects are produced by Noriko Izumo under the direction of Jōji Hata. Compositing for the film was supervised by Hiroshi Saitō and directed by Mayuko Koike. Koremi Kishi serves as the 3D CG director, and Yoshinori Horikawa is the color designer. The film is edited by Yumi Jingugi. Both songs are by the band Sumika, who also played voice acting roles in the film. The film is distributed by Aniplex in Japan and premiered in theaters on September 1, 2018.

References

External links
 Novel
  at Seven Seas Entertainment
 

 Comic
  at Seven Seas Entertainment

Light novels
2015 Japanese novels
Anime and manga based on novels
Coming-of-age anime and manga
Drama anime and manga
Futabasha manga
Japanese novels adapted into films
Japanese serial novels
Novels first published online
Romance anime and manga
School life in anime and manga
Seinen manga
Seven Seas Entertainment titles
Shōsetsuka ni Narō